is a Japanese professional shogi player ranked 7-dan.

Early life
Oikawa was born in Matsubushi, Saitama on May 6, 1987. He learned how to play shogi from his father when he was about five years old, and developed an interest in solving :tsume shogi problems. He was accepted into the Japan Shogi Association's apprentice school as a student of shogi professional  at the rank of 6-kyū in 1998, was promoted to the rank of 1-dan in 2003 and then obtained full professional status and the rank of 4-dan after finishing second in the 41st 3-dan League with a record of 13 wins and 5 losses.

Personal life
Oikawa is married to female shogi professional Hatsumi Ueda. The couple were married in June 2013 and have two daughters .

Promotion history
Oikawa's promotion history is as follows.
 1998: September: 6-kyū
 2007, October 1: 4-dan
 2013, January 8: 5-dan
 2014, October 23: 6-dan
 2021, December 20: 7-dan

References

External links
ShogiHub: Professional Player Info · Oikawa, Takuma

Japanese shogi players
Living people
Professional shogi players
Professional shogi players from Saitama Prefecture
1987 births